Finished is a 1917 novel by H. Rider Haggard featuring Allan Quatermain. It is the last in a trilogy about the Zulu kingdom, which also includes Marie and Child of Storm, and involved the dwarf Zikali.

It is set against the background of the Anglo-Zulu War of 1879, covering events leading up to the war, and ending with the death of Cetewayo. Quatermain is depicted as being one of the few survivors of the Battle of Isandhlwana. Like others in the series, several real-life characters appear, such as Cetewayo and Anthony Durnford.

External links

Novels set in colonial Africa
Novels by H. Rider Haggard
Ward, Lock & Co. books
Fiction set in 1879
1917 British novels
1917 fantasy novels
Works about the Anglo-Zulu War